The Tasmanian Government Railways H class was a class of 4-8-2 steam locomotives operated by the Tasmanian Government Railways.

History

In October 1951, the Tasmanian Government Railways (TGR) took delivery of eight H locomotives from the Vulcan Foundry, Newton-le-Willows built at the same time and basic design as the Gold Coast Railway '248' class in Ghana. They were delivered in a new emerald green livery. Four were later repainted red.

As they fell due for overhaul, withdrawals began in 1961. H2 received a major overhaul in 1966-7, the last of the class to receive such work. Two (H2 and H5) partook in  the Centenary of Rail in Tasmania celebrations in February 1971:  H5 was withdrawn after this but H2 worked periodically before being finally withdrawn in 1975. All remained in store until disposed of between 1974 and 1978.

Preservation
H1 at the Tasmanian Transport Museum, Glenorchy
H2 at the Derwent Valley Railway
H5 at the Derwent Valley Railway
H6 plinthed in Perth, Tasmania (locomotive only)
H7 at the Don River Railway
H8 at the Invermay Rail Heritage Precinct (loco chassis only)

Namesake
The H class designation was previously used by the H class, the last of which was withdrawn before 1930.

References

Railway locomotives introduced in 1951
Steam locomotives of Tasmania
Vulcan Foundry locomotives
3 ft 6 in gauge locomotives of Australia
4-8-2 locomotives